Al-Shamal Sports Club is a Qatari multi-sports club based in Madinat ash Shamal. Al-Shamal was founded in 1980. Its football team currently competes in the Qatar Stars League.

History
The club was founded in 1980 and first competed in the first tier of Qatari football in 1986. The club initially only fielded teams in handball and football, but in 1982 branched out to volleyball. In the following years, the club established teams in other sports, including table tennis and basketball.

Honours

Domestic competitions
Qatari 2nd Division
Winners (3): 2002, 2014, 2020-2021,

Qatar Sheikh Jassem Cup
Winners (1): 1996

Players
As of Qatar Stars League:

Unregistered players

Players who have played but yet to sign

Current technical staff

Note:

Managerial history

 Ibrahim Al-Sheikh
 Abel Verônico
 Cabralzinho (1988)
 Allan Jones (1995–98)
 Procópio Cardoso (1999)
 Adnan Dirjal (1999)
 Mohamed Arfaoui (1999–00)
 Maher Siddiq (2000)
 Hemdan Hamad (2000)
 Abdelkadir Bu Hamid (2000–01)
 Luisinho Lemos (2001–02)
 Uli Maslo (2002–03)
 Robert Mullier (2003)
 Valdeir Vieira (Dec 2003 – Jan 04)
 Robert Mullier (Jan 2004–05)
 Stefano Impagliazzo (2005)
 Reinhard Fabisch (2005)
 Robert Mullier (2005–06)
 Fernando Dourado (2006)
 Adilson Fernandes (Jul 2006 – Mar 08)
 Sebastião Rocha (2008)
 Stephane Morello (Oct 2008 – Jan 09)
 José Paulo (2009)
 Robertinho (2009 – Nov 09)
 Alain Michel (Nov 2009 – Jun 10)
 Wajdi Essid (2010)
 Luisinho Lemos (Sep 2010 – Feb 12)
 José Paulo (Feb 2012 – Aug 12)
 Costică Ștefănescu (Aug 2012 – Dec 2012)
 Silvio Diliberto (Dec 2012–2014)
 Dragan Cvetković (Jan 2015– May 2015)
 Adilson Fernandes (Jul 2015 – Jun 2016)
 Ilie Stan (Jul 2016–)
 Slavko Matić (Jan 2017– Oct 2017)
 Silvio Diliberto (Oct 2017–2018)
 Darko Novic (Sep 2018–present)

References

External links
Al-Shamal Club Official website

 
Shamal
Sport in Al Shamal
Association football clubs established in 1980
1980 establishments in Qatar